Dimče Gastarski (born April 24, 1975) is a Macedonian former professional basketball player who played for many clubs in Macedonia like MZT Skopje, Vardar and Karpoš Sokoli.

He is the older brother of Vlado Ilievski who is also basketball player.

External links

References

1975 births
Living people
KK MZT Skopje players
Macedonian men's basketball players
Place of birth missing (living people)
Small forwards
Shooting guards